Quiriacus was Bishop of Ostia, and suffered martyrdom during the reign of Emperor Severus Alexander. Quiriacus was martyred along with Maximus, his priest, and Archelaus, a deacon.

References

235 deaths
Italian Roman Catholic saints
3rd-century Christian martyrs
Year of birth unknown